International migration occurs when people cross state boundaries and stay in the host state for some minimum length of the time. Migration occurs for many reasons. Many people leave their home countries in order to look for economic opportunities in another country. Others migrate to be with family members who have migrated or because of political conditions in their countries. Education is another reason for international migration, as students pursue their studies abroad, although this migration is often temporary, with a return to the home country after the studies are completed.

Categories of migrants
While there are several different potential systems for categorising international migrants, one system organizes them into nine groups:
 temporary labor migrants
irregular, illegal, or undocumented migrants
highly skilled and business migrants
refugees
asylum seekers
forced migration
family members
return migrants
long-term, low-skilled migrants

These migrants can also be divided into two large groups, permanent and temporary. Permanent migrants intend to establish their permanent residence in a new country and possibly obtain that country's citizenship. Temporary migrants intend only to stay for a limited periods of time, perhaps until the end of a particular program of study or for the duration of a their work contract or a certain work season. Both types of migrants have a significant effect on the economies and societies of the chosen destination country and the country of origin.

Countries receiving migrants

Countries which receive migrants have been grouped by academics into four categories: traditional settlement countries, European countries which encouraged labour migration after World War II, European countries which receive a significant portion of their immigrant populations from their former colonies, and countries which formerly were points of emigration but have recently emerged as immigrant destinations. These countries are grouped according to a dichotomy, either migrant-sending or migrant-receiving countries, which have distinct governance issues. But this dichotomy is artificial, and it obscures issues from view, for example, when a net migrant-sending country is also a 'receiver' of migrants. 

All things considered, countries like the UAE have the most comprehensive multicultural population, accounting for almost 84% of the total population. Not only United Arab Emirates (UAE), but countries like Qatar also has 74%, Kuwait has 60%, and Bahrain has 55% of their entire population are full of diverse people who emigrate from different countries such as (India, Bangladesh, and Pakistan) which increased population by 500% over the increase from 1.3 million in 1990 to 7.8 million in 2013.  

Compared with the two governments in the United States, the Trump administration doubled the number of asylum and refugee seekers in the previous Obama administration by 12,000, and by 2020 it will only be 18,000. According to data from the immigration and border service, claims expected for this year will rise to almost three times those of previous years, while only less half than previous administrations have been accepted. The number of reports returned to the Obama administration is 110,000, reaching 368,000 by 2020. 

In these countries, economic development enabled by remittances, transnational activism in support of outgoing migrant rights, as well as rights for incoming migrants are issues. As people began to immigrate to different countries to support them financially, they also contributed to their country's economy by sending their income as remittances. According to a report by the World Bank, officials said that people from different countries remitted nearly US$400 billion in 2015, and this is increasing every year, with an increase of 0.4%, reaching US$586 billion in the following year.

Statistics
It has been predicted, that on average at least "50% of the world population would live in a foreign country" if restrictions of immigration were to be liberalised.

Incentives for migration

Push Factors
 Poor Medical Care
 Not enough jobs
 Few opportunities
 Primitive Conditions
 Political fear
 Fear of torture and mistreatment
 Religious discrimination
 Loss of wealth
 Natural disasters
 Bullying
 Lower chances of finding courtship

Pull Factors
 Chances of getting a job
 Better living standards
 Enjoyment
 Education
 Better Medical Care
 Security
 Family Links
 Lower Crime
 Better chances of finding courtship

See also
Emigration
Global Compact for Migration
Global Forum on Migration and Development
Human migration
Immigration
Transnationalism

References

External links
 Stalker's Guide to International Migration Comprehensive interactive guide, with map and statistics
 OECD Trends in International Migration and in Migration Policies
 International Network on Migration and Development

Human migration
Ethology
Population genetics